Jonathan Kale (born October 18, 1985) is a retired American-born Ivorian professional basketball player.  Kale was a four-year player for Providence College and started every game in his senior season, averaging a career best 10.1 PPG and 6.0 RPG.  He finished in the top 15 on the Providence career list in offensive rebounds and field goal percentage.

Kale was a member of the Côte d'Ivoire national basketball team at the 2009 FIBA Africa Championship.  At the tournament, he helped the team to a surprise silver medal to qualify for the country's first FIBA World Championship in 24 years by averaging 5.6 PPG and 3.6 RPG.

Following his performance at the 2009 FIBA Africa Championship, Kale signed his first professional contract with Anwil Włocławek of the Polish League on August 28, 2009.

In July 2014, Kale signed with Lille Metropole in France.

References

External links
LEB Oro profile

1985 births
Living people
American expatriate basketball people in France
American expatriate basketball people in Germany
American expatriate basketball people in Poland
American expatriate basketball people in Spain
American men's basketball players
Basketball players from Boston
Centers (basketball)
Club Ourense Baloncesto players
Ivorian men's basketball players
KK Włocławek players
Lille Métropole BC players
Phoenix Hagen players
Providence Friars men's basketball players
2010 FIBA World Championship players
People from Mattapan